Fakhri or Fakhry or Fachri is an Arabic given name and surname. Fahri is the Turkish equivalent. Fakhri (in Arabic: فَخْري fakh·riy, fakh·rī, fakh·ry) in the possessive form means "honorary, titulary". It may refer to:

Fakhri

Given name
Al-Fakhri Abdullah, 52nd Da'i al-Mutlaq of Ismaili Sulaymanis
Fakhri 'Abd al-Nur (1881–1942), Coptic Egyptian politician
Fakhri Pasha or Fahreddin Pasha (1868-1948), Turkish Army officer, commander of the Ottoman Army, governor of Medina
Fakhri A. Bazzaz (1933-2008), Iraqi-American plant ecologist
Fakhri Husaini (born 1965), Indonesian football manager and coach
Fakhri Ismail full name Mohammad Fakhri bin Ismail (born 1991), Bruneian sprinter and footballer
Fakhri Kawar, Jordanian writer and parliamentarian
Fakhri Khorvash (born 1929), Iranian stage and film actress and director
Fakhri Odeh (born 1941), Kuwaiti actor
Fakhri al-Tabaqchali (1900-1985), Iraqi judge, politician, administrator

Middle name
Mohsin Fakhri Zadeh or Mohsen Fakhrizadeh (1958–2020), Iranian nuclear physicist and scientist

Surname
Ahmed Mahmoud Al-Fakhry (1863–1926), Iraqi writer and poet
Ikhlas Fakhri (born 1940), Egyptian poet and university teacher
Jamil Fakhri (1946–2011), Pakistani film, TV and stage artist
Masood Fakhri (1932–2016), Pakistani footballer
Mohamed Fakhri (born 1999), Egyptian footballer
Nargis Fakhri (born 1982), American model and actress
Nikta Fakhri, Iranian-American physicist
Parisa Fakhri, Iranian American actress and voice actress
Sabah Fakhri (1933-2021), Syrian singer famous for Muwashahat and Qudoud Halabiyya
Shams-i Fakhri (fl. first half of the 14th-century), Iranian lexicographer and philologist

Fakhry

Middle name
Hussein Fakhry Pasha, Egyptian politician, Prime minister of Egypt
Mohamed Fakhry Abbas (born 1932), Egyptian diver
Mounir Fakhry Abdel Nour (born 1945), Egyptian businessman and politician

Surname
Ahmed Fakhry (1905–1973), Egyptian archaeologist
Ghida Fakhry, Lebanese-British journalist.
Majid Fakhry (1923-2021), Lebanese scholar of Islamic philosophy and Professor Emeritus of philosophy
Omnia Fakhry (born 1982), Egyptian modern pentathlete

Fachri
Fachri Albar (born 1981), Indonesian actor and musician

Fahri

See also
Fahri, the Turkish form of the same name
Fakhr al-Din or Fakhreddin